Serbianism may refer to:

 Serbianism (linguistics), a linguistic feature of Serbian language, especially a Serbian idiom or phrasing that appears in some other language.
 Serbianism (nationalism), nationalist ideology that advocates and promotes national and political interests of Serbia or Serbians.
 Anti-Serbianism, negative or derogatory attitude towards Serbia or Serbians.
 Philo-Serbianism, positive or affirmative attitude towards Serbia or Serbians.

See also
 
 
 Serbia (disambiguation)
 Serbians
 Names of the Serbs and Serbia